Košarkaški klub Zadar, commonly referred to as KK Zadar or simply Zadar, is a men's professional basketball club based in Zadar, Croatia. The club is a founding member and shareholder of the Adriatic Basketball Association, and competes in the ABA League and the Croatian League.

Zadar is the place where Croatian basketball was born in 1930. Zadar's reputation has been of a basketball hotbed with a team that can capture trophies at any given moment. Zadar is also known for its fanatical die hard supporters, Tornado Zadar.

History

Early years
The first basketball ball and game rules of basketball were brought to Zadar by Italian soldiers during World War II. At that time all basketball games being played in Zadar were played on an outdoor, concrete court. KK Zadar was formally founded after World War II in 1945 as FD Zadar (Fiskulturno Društvo Zadar – Physical Culture Club of Zadar). Shortly after this club's founding, its basketball section went independent and became what is today's KK Zadar. Giuseppe "Pino" Giergia played his first game for Zadar in 1945; he later became one of the club's most famous players.

The 1949, KK Zadar entered Yugoslavia's first basketball division, remaining there until the country's break-up in 1990.

1960–1970
On November 28, 1964, Krešimir Ćosić played his first game for Zadar, while being only 16 years old.

In 1965 KK Zadar won a Yugoslav League national championship. They again became champions in 1967 and 1968. In that championship year, Kreso Cosic often knew to score even a 60 points per game. The club's new arena, Jazine, was built in 1968 in only 70 days. Also in 1966, Zadar played in the Euroleague final four; they were beaten in the semi finals and ended the tournament in third place. In 1969 Krešo Ćosić left for the United States to play college basketball at Brigham Young University from 1971 to 1973.

1970–1980
In 1973, Zadar was almost relegated from the Yugoslav First Federal Basketball League. In this time of crisis, Kreso Cosic returned to the club and with 36-year-old Giuseppe "Pino" Giergia Zadar once again became Yugoslav Champions, only to repeat this success two years later.

In 1976 Giuseppe Pino Giergia retired and Krešo Ćosić left the club to fulfill his obligations toward the Yugoslav Army (At this time, conscription was mandatory). During that time club was in a very difficult situation and once again were close to relegation. The club was once again saved by Krešo Ćosić who, after his military service, became the coach of Bresto in Italy. While he was the coach of Bresto he played basketball games for KK Zadar and once again saved the club from relegation.

1980–1990
In the 1981–82 season another legendary Zadar play made his debut: Stojko Vranković. During that season club has made it to the semifinals of FIBA Korać Cup. They repeated this success the very next season. In 1986 another milestone for the club was achieved: the club got its first world record holder, Zdenko Babić, who has scored 144 points against Apoel from Cyprus in the FIBA Korać Cup.

Arijan Komazec made his debut for Zadar in 1986, and he, along with Stojko Vranković, would play a crucial role in the years to follow. After 11 years of waiting, Zadar won its sixth national championship in 1986. In the finals of that year, KK Zadar met Cibona, and in a historic and legendary match, Zadar beat Cibona by 111:110. They won the game after two overtimes and thanks to an excellent performance by Petar Popović who scored 35 points.  In 1987 the club won fourth place in the FIBA European Champions Cup. In 1989 Krešo Ćosić and Giuseppe "Pino" Giergia took charge of the club.

1990–2000
Krešo Ćosić left the club in August 1990 because of a disagreement with the club leadership. Ćosić would never return to the club, and was soon  diagnosed with cancer. He died shortly after, in 1995. In the first, newly founded, Croatian national championship, in the 1991–92 season, the club has played in the finals. That year club has also played in the Euroleague. They were the finalist of the national cup in the 1992–93 season.

In years to come the club began to stagnate in the national championship and in the European competitions. In 1996 with a new coach at the helm, Danijel Jusup, Zadar reached the playoffs of the national championship, where they lost to Cibona. They repeated this success the following year with Emilio Kovačić as Zadar's key player, yet Cibona won the title once again.

In 1998 Zadar won the Krešimir Ćosić Cup, Croatia's basketball cup competitions. Marko Popović, the son of Petar Popović made his debut in 1998 for Zadar at age 16. In the summer of the 1999 Arijan Komazec returned to Zadar from Olympiacos, and the club had also signed Dino Rađa from Panathinaikos. In the season 1999–2000 Zadar had won its 2nd Krešimir Ćosić cup and had played, once again, in the semifinals of national championship and Saporta cup. Dino Rađa and Arijan Komazec proved as crucial players for the success in that season.

2000–present

In the seasons of 2000–01, 2001–02 Zadar played in the playoffs of national championship twice and once in Krešimir Ćosić Cup, yet they did not win any of the possible three titles. In the season of 2002–03 Danijel Jusup returned to the club as head coach. During that season, with Marko Popović as a lead player, Zadar won its third Krešimir Ćosić Cup, as well as the newly established regional ABA League, founded on the ashes of the Yugoslav league and containing the best teams from the former Yugoslav republics. Zadar beat Maccabi Tel Aviv in the final.

In the summer of 2003, Marko Popović left Zadar as Emilo Kovačić returned. Going into the ULEB Cup for a third season in 2004–05, Zadar once again missed the playoffs by a single win. In the season of 2004–05 Zadar finally won the Croatian national championship, after a 19-year wait. That season Zadar has also won their fourth Krešimir Ćosić Cup in a truly historical season. In 2006, they repeated their success from previous season in the Krešimir Ćosić Cup winning their fifth cup. Zadar returned to the national league final in each of the last two seasons, but KK Cibona stood on its way to another league title.

In 2008, Zadar became the Croatian champion for the second time, beating KK Split 3–2 in the best of five series. The final game of the series, which Zadar won 89 to 65, was the last game ever played at Jazine, affectionately called "The Temple of Croatian Basketball" by many fans and basketball aficionados.

Then after a long wait, season 2019/2020. Zadar won the Croatian Cup and was on its way to winning the Croatian Championship when the season was canceled due to COVID-19.
The following year Zadar won yet another cup beating Split and finally won the championship again, again beating Split.

Domestic league and cup winning rosters
1964–65: Vladimir Ćubrić, Đuro Stipčević, Miljenko Valčić, Marko Ostarčević, Bruno Marcelić, Jure Košta, Josip Đerđa, Petar Anić, Petar Jelić, Mile Marcelić, Krešimir Ćosić, Željko Troskot, Milan Komazec. Coach: Enzo Sovitti.
1966–67: Josip Đerđa, Krešimir Ćosić, Coach: Đorđo Zdrilić.
1968–69: Valčić, Stipčević, Laura, Komazec, Troskot, Košta, Giergia, Ćosić, G. Brajković, Bruno Marcelić, Mile Marcelić. Coach: Đorđo Zdrilić.
 Cup 1970: Vlado Vanjak, Đuro Stipčević, Goran Brajković, Bruno Marcelić, Milan Komazec, Pino Giergia, Vlado Gruškovnjak, Krešimir Ćosić, Nedjeljko-Mišo Ostarčević, Nikola Olujić, Petar Jelić.  Coach: Trpimir Lokin.
1973–74: Branko Bakija, Jure Fabijanić, Bruno Marcelić, Čedomir Perinčić, Branko Skroče, Pino Giergia, Krešimir Ćosić, Zdravko Jerak and Tomislav Matulović. Coach: Lucijan Valčić
1974–75: Čedomir Perinčić, Jure Fabijanić, Boris Babić, Branko Bakija, Bruno Marcelić, Branko Šuljak, Pino Giergia, Krešimir Ćosić, Zdravko Jerak, Darko Fabulić, Nedjeljko Ostarčević, Tomislav Matulović, Branko Skroče, Josip-Pino Grdović, Bruno Petani, Žarko Bjedov. Coach: Lucijan Valčić, Trpimir Lokin, Leonard Bajlo.
1985–86: Darko Pahlić, Petar Popović, Milan Mlađan, Ante Matulović, Zdenko Babić, Dražen Blažević, Stojko Vranković, Veljko Petranović, Ivica Obad, Boris Hrabrov, Drago Čiklić i Arijan Komazec. Coach: Vlade Đurović

Honours
Total titles: 19

Domestic competitions
Croatian League
 Winners (3): 2004–05, 2007–08, 2020–21
 Runners-up (11): 1991–92, 1997–98, 1998–99, 1999–00, 2001–02, 2003–04, 2005–06, 2006–07, 2008–09, 2009–10, 2012–13
Croatian Cup
 Winners (8): 1997–98, 1999–00, 2002–03, 2004–05, 2005–06, 2006–07, 2019–20, 2020–21
 Runners-up (7): 1992–93, 2000–01, 2001–02, 2003–04, 2010–11, 2014–15, 2015–16
Yugoslav League (defunct)
 Winners (6): 1965, 1967, 1967–68, 1973–74, 1974–75, 1985–86
Yugoslav Cup (defunct)
 Winners (1): 1969–70

European competitions
EuroLeague
 Semifinalists (2): 1967–68, 1974–75
 4th place (1): 1986–87
FIBA Saporta Cup (defunct)
 Semifinalists (1): 1999–00
FIBA Korać Cup (defunct)
 Semifinalists (3): 1981–82, 1982–83, 1988–89

Regional competitions
Adriatic League
 Winners (1): 2002–03

Other competitions
FIBA International Christmas Tournament (defunct)
 4th place (1): 1999

Top performances in European & worldwide competitions

Season by season

In Yugoslavia

In Croatia

Home courts

Players

Current roster

Notable players

1940s
 Tullio Rochlitzer

1950s

1960s
 Josip Gjergja
 Bruno Marcelić
 Đuro Stipčević
 Željko Troskot

1970s
 Krešimir Ćosić
 Zdravko Jerak
 Tomislav Matulović
 Nedjeljko Ostarčević
 Čedomir Perinčić
 Douglas Richards
 Branko Skroče

1980s
 Zdenko Babić
 Draženko Blažević
 Dragomir Čiklić
 Boris Hrabrov
 Ante Matulović
 Milan Mlađan
 Ivica Obad
 Darko Pahlić
 Veljko Petranović
 Petar Popović
 Ivan Sunara
 Stojko Vranković

1990s
 Dejan Bodiroga
 Alan Gregov
 Arijan Komazec
 Emilio Kovačić
 Ivica Marić
 Aramis Naglić
 Dino Rađa
 Jurica Ružić
 Stipe Šarlija
 Josip Vranković

2000s
 Marko Banić
 Vladimir Boisa
 Corey Brewer
 Carl English
 Desmon Farmer
 Marlon Garnett
 Todor Gečevski
 Jurica Golemac
 Julius Johnson
 Dejan Ivanov
 Jure Lalić
 Branimir Longin
 Davor Marcelić
 Michael McDonald
 Michael Meeks
 Dean Oliver
 Davor Pejčinović
 Hrvoje Perić
 Hrvoje Perinčić
 Marko Popović
 Damir Rančić
 Rumeal Robinson
 Tomislav Ružić
 Rok Stipčević
 Damir Tvrdić
 Jakov Vladović
 Frano Čolak

2010s
 Miro Bilan
 Ante Delaš
 James Florence
 Ive Ivanov
 Ivan Marinković
 Jusuf Nurkić
 Darko Planinić
 Ivan Ramljak
 Marko Šutalo
 Romeo Travis
 Luka Žorić

2020s
 Dominik Mavra

Head coaches

 Ivica Burić
 Vlade Đurović
 Rudolf Jugo
 Danijel Jusup
 Aleksandar Petrović
 Zmago Sagadin
 Enzo Sovitti
 Luciano Valčić
 Vlado Vanjak
 Veljko Mršić

Members of the Basketball Hall of Fame
 Krešimir Ćosić
 Dino Rađa

Notes

References

External links

Official Website of KK Zadar 
Tornado Zadar - Official Zadar Fan Site 
KK Zadar at Eurobasket.com

 
Basketball teams in Croatia
Basketball teams established in 1945
Basketball teams in Yugoslavia